The 1945 Paris–Tours was the 39th edition of the Paris–Tours cycle race and was held on 29 April 1945. The race started in Paris and finished in Tours. The race was won by Paul Maye.

General classification

References

1945 in French sport
1945
April 1945 sports events in Europe